Abdelrahman Sayed Abdou (born 30 January 1996) is an Egyptian handball player for Al Ahly and the Egyptian national team.

He participated at the World Men's Handball Championship in 2017, 2019 and 2021.

References

1996 births
Living people
Egyptian male handball players
Handball players at the 2014 Summer Youth Olympics
Competitors at the 2022 Mediterranean Games
Mediterranean Games silver medalists for Egypt
Mediterranean Games medalists in handball
21st-century Egyptian people